Mamadou Diarra (born 18 October 1970) is a Senegalese footballer who plays as a striker. He played in eleven matches for the Senegal national football team from 1992 to 1994. He was also named in Senegal's squad for the 1990 African Cup of Nations tournament.

References

External links
 

1970 births
Living people
Senegalese footballers
Senegal international footballers
1990 African Cup of Nations players
1992 African Cup of Nations players
1994 African Cup of Nations players
Place of birth missing (living people)
Association football forwards